This is a list of historical, modern and projected shopping malls in Sarajevo, Bosnia and Herzegovina.

Historical
 Bezistan (1551), Baščaršija

Modern
 Sarajevo City Center (2014) 160 stores + 5 star hotel
 ARIA Center (2010) 125 stores  |  ICSC European Shopping Centre Awards winner 2011
 Alta Shopping Center (2011) 70 stores 
 Bosmal City Center (2009) 50 stores (upon fulfilment)
 Importanne Center (2010) 35 stores
 Mercator Sarajevo (2000) 34 stores
 Grand Centar Ilidža (2007) 33 stores
 Mercator Dobrinja (2008) 20 stores

Projected
 Airport Center Sarajevo (2013) 110 stores + multiplex cinema and airport connection
 Betanija City Center (2014) 90 stores + hotel

See also
 Sarajevo
 Tourism in Bosnia and Herzegovina

References

 
Tourism in Bosnia and Herzegovina
Economy of Bosnia and Herzegovina
Shopping malls
Shopping malls